Edwin Webb may refer to 

 Edwin C. Webb, biochemist
 Edwin Y. Webb, US congressman and judge